Julian Williams may refer to:

 Julian Williams (American football) (born 1990), Arena Football League player
 Julian Williams (boxer) (born 1990), American professional boxer